Benjamin McCully Crane (born March 6, 1976) is an American professional golfer who plays on the PGA Tour.

Early years and amateur career
Crane was born in Portland, Oregon. He was introduced to golf at age five by his grandfather. He grew up playing at the nearby Portland Golf Club, where Ben Hogan won the Portland Open in 1945.

Crane graduated from Beaverton High School in 1994 and attended Baylor University in Waco, Texas, but did not play golf for the Bears. He transferred to the University of Oregon in Eugene, Oregon and played golf for the Ducks. He graduated in 1999 and turned professional that year.

Professional career
Crane won two events on the second tier Buy.com Tour, the first in 2000 and the second in 2001. In December 2001, Crane earned his PGA Tour card for 2002, and won for the first time on the PGA Tour at the BellSouth Classic the following year. His second win came in 2005 at the U.S. Bank Championship in Milwaukee. Also in 2005 he finished second at the Booz Allen Classic and Bell Canadian Open, third at the 84 Lumber Classic, sixth at the B.C. Open and seventh at The Tour Championship, which placed him 19th in the season earnings with over $2.4 million. In February 2006, just before he turned thirty, he was the highest-ranked American golfer under that age in the Official World Golf Ranking.

Crane has said that he does not like to know with whom he will be paired, saying, "I looked up to a lot of these guys who I'm now playing with. So, I didn't want to have to go to sleep thinking about it." He is also considered one of the slowest players on the tour. On at least two occasions his extremely slow progress through a course has become a media issue, including one in which a fellow tour player Rory Sabbatini played out of turn.

Crane missed the majority of the 2007 season due to back problems, and played on the PGA Tour in 2008 on a major medical extension. He finished 64th on the money list to retain his card for 2009. In January 2010, Crane carded a final-round 70 to win the Farmers Insurance Open at Torrey Pines by a single stroke. In May he finished third at the Crowne Plaza Invitational at Colonial, fourth at The Players Championship and seventh at the Byron Nelson Championship. In October, he won the CIMB Asia Pacific Classic Malaysia, an event co-sanctioned by the PGA Tour (but unofficial money) and Asian Tour. With 12 top-25s in 24 events, he ended 23rd on the money list with over $2.8 million.

He picked up his fourth win on the PGA Tour in 2011 at the McGladrey Classic, defeating Webb Simpson in a playoff. Crane shot a final round 63 to make the playoff, having at one stage been eight strokes back of the leader. The round included eight birdies and one bogey in ten holes from the 8th to the 17th.

Crane picked up his fifth victory on the PGA Tour in 2014 at the FedEx St. Jude Classic. He would pick up the victory in wire to wire fashion, winning by a single stroke over Troy Merritt despite three bogeys and no birdies for his final round.

Personal
Crane is married to Heather Crane; the couple has four children. Crane is a Christian.

Crane currently is one of four golfers in the PGA Tour exclusive boy band, "Golf Boys" - with  Rickie Fowler, Bubba Watson, and Hunter Mahan.  The Golf Boys currently have a popular YouTube video for the song "Oh Oh Oh." Farmers Insurance will donate $1,000 for every 100,000 views of the video. The charitable proceeds will support both Farmers and Ben Crane charitable initiatives.

Incorrect quotation about Tiger Woods
In early December 2009 Life & Style magazine reported that Crane had called Tiger Woods a "fake and a phony" due to Woods' recently publicized marital infidelity. Crane denied making the remarks, stating that he was not even at Q-school, where the magazine claimed he was interviewed.

"My wife and I have prayed for Tiger and Elin, and we want nothing but the best for them", Crane said. In January 2010 the magazine retracted its story, stating that the evidence indicated that the comments were made by someone impersonating Crane.

Amateur wins
this list may be incomplete
1997 Pacific Northwest Amateur
1998 Pacific Coast Amateur

Professional wins (8)

PGA Tour wins (5)

PGA Tour playoff record (1–0)

Asian Tour wins (1)

1Co-sanctioned by the PGA Tour, but unofficial money event.

Buy.com Tour wins (2)

Buy.com Tour playoff record (1–0)

Results in major championships

CUT = missed the half-way cut
WD = withdrew
"T" = tied

Summary

Most consecutive cuts made – 2 (four times)
Longest streak of top-10s – 1

Results in The Players Championship

CUT = missed the halfway cut
"T" indicates a tie for a place

Results in World Golf Championships

QF, R16, R32, R64 = Round in which player lost in match play
"T" = Tied
WD = Withdrew
Note that the HSBC Champions did not become a WGC event until 2009.

See also
2001 PGA Tour Qualifying School graduates
List of golfers with most PGA Tour wins

References

External links

4U Management: Ben Crane

American male golfers
Oregon Ducks men's golfers
PGA Tour golfers
Golfers from Portland, Oregon
Golfers from Texas
Beaverton High School alumni
Baylor University alumni
People from Westlake, Texas
1976 births
Living people